Art-sur-Meurthe (literally Art on Meurthe) is a commune in the Meurthe-et-Moselle department in northeastern France.

Population

In the past, inhabitants of Art-sur-Meurthe were known by their neighbours as haut-la-queue ("hoity-toitys").

See also
Communes of the Meurthe-et-Moselle department

References

Artsurmeurthe